Lake Charley is a lake in Douglas County, in the U.S. state of Minnesota.

Lake Charley was named for the son of a pioneer settler; Lake Louise was named after the pioneer's daughter.

See also
List of lakes in Minnesota

References

Lakes of Minnesota
Lakes of Douglas County, Minnesota